is a city located in Nagano Prefecture, Japan. , the city had an estimated population of 97,761 in 39744 households. and a population density of 290 persons per km2.

Etymology of Azumino
Azumino is a combination of two words, "Azumi" and "no". "Azumi" comes from the Azumi people, who are said to have moved to the "no" (plain) in ancient times. The Azumi people originally lived in northern Kyushu, and were famed for their skills in fishing and navigation. "The Azumi people" can be translated as "the people who live on the sea." The reason why the seafaring people migrated to this mountainous region is a mystery.

Geography
Azumino is located in the Azumino Plateau on the northwestern end of the Matsumoto Basin, between mountain ranges to the west and east. The range of mountains on the western border is known as the Northern Alps (Hida Mountains) and is popular among hikers all over Japan. To the south is the city of Matsumoto, Nagano prefecture's second largest city. To the north lies the city of Ōmachi, and north of Ōmachi is the village of Hakuba. Hakuba was the site of many of the ski events during the 1998 Winter Olympic Games.

Surrounding municipalities
Nagano Prefecture
 Matsumoto
 Ōmachi
 Ikeda
 Matsukawa
 Chikuhoku
 Ikusaka

Climate
The city has a climate characterized by characterized by hot and humid summers, and relatively mild winters (Köppen climate classification Cfa). The mountainous portions of the city are considered part of the snow country of Japan, with heavy accumulations of snow in winter.

History
The area of present-day Azumino was part of ancient Shinano Province. The area was part of the holdings of Matsumoto Domain during the Edo period. The modern city of Azumino was established on October 1, 2005, by the merger of the town of Akashina (from Higashichikuma District), the towns of Hotaka and Toyoshina, and the villages of Horigane and Misato (all from Minamiazumi District).

Demographics
Per Japanese census data, the population of Azumino has recently plateaued after several decades of growth.

Government
Azumino has a mayor-council form of government with a directly elected mayor and a unicameral city legislature of 22 members.

Education
Azumino has ten public elementary schools and seven public middle schools. The city has four public high schools operated by the Nagano Prefectural Board of Education.

Transportation

Railway
 East Japan Railway Company - Ōito Line
  -  -  -  -  -  -  -  - 
 East Japan Railway Company - Shinonoi Line
 -

Highway
 Nagano Expressway

Sister cities

Domestic
Misato, Saitama, Saitama Prefecture
Edogawa, Tokyo
Musashino, Tokyo
Manazuru, Kanagawa
Sangō, Nara
Higashi-ku, Fukuoka

International
 - Kramsach, Austria, since November 25, 1993 
 - Collierville, Tennessee, United States

Local attractions

Azumino is home to the world's largest wasabi farm, Daio Wasabi Farm.
Jōkyō Gimin Memorial Museum
Hotaka Jinja

Notable people from Azumino
Keikoku Fujimori (1835–1905), artist & educator
Kigenji Iguchi (1870–1938), educator
Kiyoshi Kiyosawa (1890–1945), journalist
Kei Kumai (1930–2007), film director
Kyūsaku Matsuzawa (1855–1887), people's rights activist
Risaku Mutai (1890–1974), philosopher
Rokuzan Ogiwara (1879–1910), sculptor
Aizō Sōma (1870–1954), founded Nakamuraya
Tada Kasuke (?–1687), executed farmer
Setsuro Takahashi (1914–2007), lacquerware artist
Etsujirō Uehara (1877–1962), political scientist & politician
Bumpei Usui, a professional artist, came from Tōmi in Horikin Village, Minami Azumino County, Nagano Prefecture.
Yoshimi Usui (1905–1987), editor & writer
Masaaki Iinuma (1912–1941), pilot & aviation pioneer

References

External links 

Official Website 

 
Cities in Nagano Prefecture